Izgorje is a small dispersed settlement in the hills south of Žiri in the Upper Carniola region of Slovenia.

Name
Izgorje was attested in written sources as Isgeori in 1500.

References

External links

Izgorje on Geopedia

Populated places in the Municipality of Žiri